The Terekhol or Tiracol River is a river in western India. In its upper reaches it is known as the Banda River and in the lower reaches as the Tiracol. It forms the boundary between Sindhudurg district of Maharashtra state and North Goa district of Goa state for some distance. The Terekhol rises in the environs of the Manohargad in the Western Ghats and flows in a south-westerly direction to meet the Arabian Sea.
 
The Portuguese era Tiracol Fort is located on the northern mouth of this river which is also in the far north-west of Goa, which has been turned into a heritage hotel now. The fort has been converted into a tourist destination, maintained in excellent condition. From Querim, you can cross the Tiracol River by ferry and then it is 2 km to the fort.

References

Rivers of Goa
Rivers of Maharashtra
Rivers of India
Bodies of water of the Arabian Sea